Eublemma nigrivitta  is a species of moth of the  family Erebidae. It is found in Somalia and South Africa.

References

Boletobiinae
Moths described in 1902